Michael van Poppel (born in Tilburg, the Netherlands) is the founder and President of BNO News.

Van Poppel ran a popular Twitter-based news service called BreakingNews from May 2007 until December 2009. It scooped regular news organizations on political news, natural disasters, and other breaking news and grew quickly in 2009, when it went from 16,000 followers to more 1.5 million, making it one of the most popular news services on Twitter at that time.

On September 7, 2007, Van Poppel obtained an authentic videotape featuring Al-Qaeda leader Osama bin Laden, which BNO News licensed to the Reuters news agency. In February 2009, BNO News won the Best in News award at the 1st Shorty Awards in New York.

The BreakingNews Twitter account was acquired by NBC News in December 2019.

In a press release in late November 2009, Van Poppel announced plans to offer a subscription-based news wire service to other news outlets, primarily those in the United States. The news wire service launched in January 2010 with NBC News as its first client. Other news organizations bought subscriptions to the service soon after.

References

External links
 BNO News
 Van Poppel's Twitter

Living people
Dutch journalists
People from Tilburg
Year of birth missing (living people)